Karl Rudin was a Swiss footballer who played for FC Basel. He played mainly in the position as forward.

Football career
Between the years 1917 and 1921 Rudin played a total of 24 games for Basel scoring a total of three goals. 14 of these games were in the Swiss Serie A and 10 were friendly games. He scored his three goals in the domestic league. The first of which was on 21 January 1918. he scored the equaliser as Basel drew 2–2 at home against Nordstern Basel.

References

Sources
 Rotblau: Jahrbuch Saison 2017/2018. Publisher: FC Basel Marketing AG. 
 Die ersten 125 Jahre. Publisher: Josef Zindel im Friedrich Reinhardt Verlag, Basel. 
 Verein "Basler Fussballarchiv" Homepage

FC Basel players
Swiss men's footballers
Association football forwards
Year of birth missing
Year of death missing